

The Baumgärtl Heliofly III/57 and Baumgärtl Heliofly III/59 were 1940s experimental backpack helicopters designed and built by the Austrian-designer Paul Bäumgartl. Following on from his earlier experiments with strap-on autogyros the Heliofly III/57 was powered by two  Argus As 8 piston engines each driving a single-blade of the contra-rotating rotors.

A problem with the supply of the As 8 engine forced a  re-design to use one  engine, powering two rotors on a common co-axial shaft, with the engine driving one rotor directly and the other through gearing to overcome the torque effects.

Specifications (16hp)

See also

References

Notes

Bibliography

Nowarra, Heinz J.. Die Deutsche Luftruestung 1933-1945 - Vol.1 - AEG-Dornier. Bernard & Graefe Verlag. 1993. Koblenz.  (Gesamtwek),  (Band 1)

1940s Austrian experimental aircraft
1940s Austrian helicopters
Heliofly III
Twin-engined piston helicopters
Single-engined piston helicopters
Aircraft first flown in 1942

pl:Heliofly III